Just Between Us is a 2010 Croatian drama film directed by Rajko Grlić starring Miki Manojlović, Bojan Navojec, Nataša Dorčić, Daria Lorenci and Ksenija Marinković. The film is a co-production involving Croatia's Mainframe Production, Serbia's Yodi Movie Craftsman and Slovenia's Studio Maj and was additionally financed by the Croatian Radiotelevision and Eurimages.

Plot
The film, set in Zagreb, centers around two middle-aged middle class brothers, Nikola and Braco (played by Manojlović and Navojec) and the parallel lives they lead amid a web of complex relationships with their wives, mistresses and children. The film has been described by critics as an examination of "loneliness, adultery and urban life", and has been praised for its authentic depiction of contemporary Zagreb.

Cast 

 Miki Manojlović - Nikola 
 Bojan Navojec - Braco
 Ksenija Marinković - Marta
 Daria Lorenci - Anamarija
 Nataša Dorčić - Latica
 Nina Ivanišin - Davorka
 Buga Šimić - Maja
 Živko Anočić - Nino
 Krešimir Mikić - Jura

Awards
The film was nominated for the Crystal Globe at the 45th Karlovy Vary International Film Festival, where Rajko Grlić won the Best Director award, and where it also won the Label Europa Cinemas award. It also went on to win seven Golden Arena awards at the 2010 Pula Film Festival, the Croatian national film awards, including Best Film, Best Director (Rajko Grlić), Best Supporting Actress (Ksenija Marinković), Best Cinematography (Slobodan Trninić), Best Production Design (Ivo Hušnjak), Best Film Music (Alfi Kabiljo and Alan Bjelinski) and Best Sound Editing (Srđan Kurpjel).

References

External links
 
 

2010 films
2010s Croatian-language films
2010 drama films
Films directed by Rajko Grlić
Adultery in films
Films set in Zagreb
Croatian drama films